Mininco may refer to:
, a locality in Collipulli
Mininco River, a river in south-central Chile
Mininco Formation, a geological formation in Chile
Forestal Mininco, a forestry company in Chile